John A. Pearce (born June 6, 1969) is a Utah judge, appointed to the Utah Supreme Court in November, 2015 by Governor Gary Herbert. The Utah Senate later confirmed Pearce in a 21–0 vote in December 2015. He was sworn in on January 29, 2016.

Prior to being confirmed to the Utah Supreme Court, Pearce served on the Utah Court of Appeals. He has also served as general counsel in Governor Herbert's office. Pearce was born and raised in Magna, Utah and began his legal career as an associate at Wilson Sonsini Goodrich & Rosati. Later, Pearce was a shareholder at Jones Waldo in Salt Lake City. Justice Pearce graduated from Cyprus High in Magna, got an undergraduate degree from the University of Utah in economics, and received his Juris Doctor from the University of California, Berkeley. Pearce also served as an adjunct professor at the University of Utah S.J. Quinney College of Law.

References

1969 births
Living people
21st-century American judges
People from Magna, Utah
University of Utah alumni
UC Berkeley School of Law alumni
Justices of the Utah Supreme Court
Utah state court judges
Utah lawyers